
Year 656 (DCLVI) was a leap year starting on Friday (link will display the full calendar) of the Julian calendar. The denomination 656 for this year has been used since the early medieval period, when the Anno Domini calendar era became the prevalent method in Europe for naming years.

Events 
 By place 

 Europe 
 February 1 – King Sigebert III of Austrasia, age 25, dies after a 22-year reign. His 5-year-old son Dagobert II is kidnapped by the court chancellor, Grimoald the Elder, who makes his own son king, and exiles him to an Irish monastery. Dagobert is placed with Bishop Dido of Poitiers, while Grimoald's son Childebert the Adopted assumes the Austrasian throne.

 Britain 
 King Oswiu of Northumbria invades Pengwern (modern Wales) and kills King Cynddylan in battle, near the River Trent. Cynddylan's brother Morfael and the rest of the royal family flee to Glastening (Wessex).
 King Œthelwald of Deira is removed from office by his uncle Oswiu, because of his desertion at the Battle of the Winwaed, and replaced by the latter's son Alhfrith, as subject king in a united Northumbria.

 Arabian Empire 
 First Islamic Civil War: An armed revolt erupts in Egypt; several Muslim sympathisers travel to Medina to rally support, beginning the fitna (literally meaning the 'trail of faith'). The Muslim expansion comes to a halt as the martial energies of the Islamic forces are directed inwards.
 June 17 – Uthman ibn Affan is murdered at Medina after an 11-year reign. He is succeeded by Muhammad's cousin and son-in-law Ali ibn Abi-Talib, who becomes the fourth caliph of the Rashidun Caliphate. He makes Kufah (Iraq) his capital, but the succession is disputed.
 November 7 – Battle of the Camel: Rebel Arabs under Aisha (widow of Muhammad) begin a revolt against Ali. They are defeated at Basra, and Aisha is exiled to Medina. During the battle 10,000 people lose their lives, with each party bearing equal loss.
 Abdullah ibn Sa'ad, governor of Upper Egypt, dies after a 12-year regime in which he has defeated neighboring Nubia.

 Asia 
 Empress Saimei of Japan builds a new palace at Asuka (Nara Prefecture), because her former residence caught fire. This construction is called the "Mad Canal" by the people of that day, wasting the labor of tens of thousand workers and a large amount of money.

 Polynesia 
 September 24 – A total solar eclipse is observable from Easter Island. The next at this location would not occur until July 11, 2010.

 By topic 

 Religion 
 Li Xiăn, seventh son of the Chinese emperor Gao Zong, is made crown prince. His lavish palatial mansion in Chang'an is converted into a Daoist abbey during the Tang Dynasty (approximate date).
 The Yasaka Shrine is constructed in the Gion district of Kyoto (Japan).

Births 
 Hubertus, bishop of Liège (approximate date)
 Zhong Zong, emperor of the Tang Dynasty (d. 710)

Deaths 
 June 20 – Uthman ibn Affan, Muslim Caliph (b. 577) (martyred)
 Abdullah ibn Sa'ad, Arab governor
 Crundmáel Erbuilc, king of the Uí Ceinnselaig (Ireland)
 Cui Dunli, general of the Tang Dynasty (b. 596)
 Cynddylan, king of Pengwern (Wales)
 Li Daozong, prince of the Tang Dynasty
 Peada, king of Mercia (Midlands)
 Sigebert III, king of Austrasia (or 660)
 Zubayr ibn al-Awwam, Arab general (b. 594) (martyred)

References

Sources